Yehuda Maayan (also Mayan; born April 19, 1955) is an Israeli former Olympic competitive sailor, and Chairman of the Israel Sailing Association.

Sailing career

Maayan competed for Israel at the 1976 Summer Olympics with Yoel Sela, at the age of 21, in Montreal, Canada, in Sailing - Mixed Two Person Heavyweight Dinghy, and came in 17th.

Israel Sailing Association
Maayan became Chairman of the Israel Sailing Association in 1992. In 1993, he established a women's team, with Shani Kedmi and Anat Fabrikant, who went on to finish 12th at representing Israel at the 1996 Summer Olympics and 4th representing Israel at the 2000 Summer Olympics.

References

External links
 
 
 

1955 births
Living people
Israeli male sailors (sport)
Olympic sailors of Israel
Sailors at the 1976 Summer Olympics – Flying Dutchman
Israeli Jews
Jewish sailors (sport)